A vertical vowel system is the  system of vowels in a language that requires only vowel height to phonemically distinguish vowels. Theoretically, rounding, frontness and backness could also be used in one-dimensional vowel systems; however, vertical refers specifically to the usage of vowel height as the sole distinguishing feature.

Vertical vowel systems have only been uncovered in the underlying representation of various languages' phonology. Phonetically, all known natural languages employ both front and back vowels. In a vertical vowel system, the occurrence of front vs. back vowels is however predictable, governed by one or more phonological processes.

Two different diachronic mechanisms may give rise to a vertical vowel system. In some cases, the front-back distinction may simply be lost when vowels are merged. Similarly, the vowel  is heard in Wichita utterances, although this vowel is usually the phonetic result of a contraction of sequences of [short vowel + w + short vowel], a phenomenon also noted in other languages with vertical vowel systems.

More striking is a phenomenon whereby one or more phonological features of vowels are lost and reassigned to the consonants at the syllable periphery, leaving all vowels underspecified for frontness, rounding, or both. This has occurred in Arrernte, in which vowel rounding has been lost and consonantal labialisation gained as a result. All members of the Northwest Caucasian family have reassigned both rounding and frontness to the syllable periphery, the former surfacing as consonantal labialisation, and the latter as palatalisation. This has also occurred in Marshallese. Some argue that the short vowels of Irish have similarly lost their frontness specification, forming a rudimentary vertical system. However, almost all Irish consonants appear in palatalised and non-palatalised forms, so the loss of frontness specification is viewed as a consequence, rather than a cause, of consonant palatalisation. Furthermore, the loss of frontness specification in Irish is limited to the short vowels of the language; the long vowels of Irish retain a front-back distinction.  Marshallese also has front-back distinction for its long vowels, but these are phonemically sequences of  where  is a semiconsonant; for example,  "rose" is broadly , but more narrowly .

Zero-dimensional vowel systems, with one phonemic vowel only, have been postulated for Nuxálk, Kabardian and some Abkhaz dialects, as well as several Central Chadic languages such as Moloko. A phonological analysis with no phonemic vowels at all has been shown to be possible for Mofu-Gudur.

Vertical vowel systems been noted for the following languages:

 Northwest Caucasian
 Abkhaz (two degrees)
 Adyghe (three degrees)
 Kabardian (two, perhaps three degrees)
 Ubykh (two, perhaps three degrees)
 Caddoan
 Wichita (three degrees)
Pama-Nyungan
Arrernte (two degrees)
 Austronesian
 Marshallese (four degrees)
 Sepik–Ramu languages
 Goidelic
 Irish (three degrees for short vowels only)
 Sinitic
 Mandarin Chinese (two degrees, according to some analyses)

Kazakh, Mongolian and Tundra Nenets have vowel systems resembling a vertical vowel system in that backness is not phonemic; however, they are not one-dimensional. Backness has in Kazakh and Mongolian been reinterpreted as advanced tongue root, while in Tundra Nenets backness is determined according to the palatalization of adjacent consonants. Vowels are otherwise distinguished, in addition to height, by diphthongization and, in Kazakh and Tundra Nenets, rounding.

Vowel prosody system

Complex interaction between a vertical vowel system and vowel harmony, known as a vowel prosody system, appears in many of the Central Chadic languages. One of the best known cases is Margi, but the phenomenon has been documented in more than thirty languages of the group altogether, including all or most languages of five geographically adjacent subgroups:
 Daba group: Buwal, Daba, Mbudum, Mina
 Hurza group: Mbuko, Vame
 Musgum group: Mbara, Muskum
 Mafa group: Cuvok, Mafa
 Mofu group: Dugwor, Gemzek, Mada, Merey, Mofu-Gudur, Moloko, Muyang, Ouldeme, Zulgo
Further examples of the system of the appear in e.g. Gidar and Podoko.

A typical feature for these languages is that vowel frontness or roundedness cannot be considered a segmental feature but is instead a suprasegmental feature, spanning an entire morpheme or phonological word. All Central Chadic languages allow frontness as a prosody and therefore contrast minimal pairs such as  vs. ; only some allow roundedness as a prosody, and in others, rounded vowels are found only next to labialized velar consonants.

References

Sources
 

 
Vowels
Phonology